Evidence and arrest units (German: Beweissicherungs- und Festnahmeeinheiten  lit. Units for arrests and securing evidence, abbreviated BFE or BFHu) are special units of the German state police forces Landespolizei and the German Federal Police.

These units were established in 1987 after the deaths of two police officers during the demonstrations against the expansion of Frankfurt Airport.

Organization
BFE units are generally part of the Bereitschaftspolizei police support groups and their structure may vary between the different state police forces. A sample structure may look like this:
 Command: four officers
 Technical support: four officers
 Securing evidence: six officers
 Six arrest teams: five officers per team

BFE+ 

As a consequence from the terrorist attacks in Paris 2015, each of the five BFE units of the Federal Police was tasked with enhancing one of its squads to a BFE+ unit. The purpose of the BFE+ units is to close the gap between the regular BFE units and the GSG 9, thus reducing the response time and workload for the GSG 9 or the SEK units.

BFE+ personnel are trained in a 6-week course by the GSG 9 in special tactics and skills which may be required to deal with threats similar to the Charlie Hebdo attack or the November 2015 Paris attacks.

Notable operations of BFE+ include high risk arrests in the course of investigations against a Syrian human trafficking network or riot control during the 2017 G20 Hamburg summit.

Duties
 Riot control
 Providing assistance on high-risk warrants
 Obtaining evidence of criminal acts during large events such as soccer games or demonstrations

Equipment

Due to their duties in dangerous environments, the BFE units are often equipped with special equipment which may include:

Special equipment
 Breaching tools
 Still and video cameras
 Portable fire extinguishers
 Crowbars and battering rams

Weapons
 Tonfa or collapsible batons
 Maces and other non-lethal weaponry
 Sidearms
 Submachine guns
 HK G36K (BFE+)

Uniforms
 Ballistic vests
 Riot gear
 Fire-resistant clothing

The arrest units (German: Unterstützungskommandos, abbreviated USK) of the Police of the State of Bavaria wear special uniforms to distinguish themselves from the regular police units. The arrest units wear black uniforms with specialized assignment patches while regular units wear dark blue uniforms.

See also
 Snatch squad

References

External links

Police units of Germany
Non-military counterterrorist organizations